A dementor is a type of evil being in the Harry Potter stories.

Dementor may also refer to:

 Professor Dementor, an antagonist character (a mad scientist) in the animated series Kim Possible
 A character in the DC Comics episode Guy Gardner: Warrior
 Ampulex dementor, a species of cockroach wasp native to Thailand
 The fictional antagonist in the Turbo Man franchise in the movie Jingle All the Way